An Election to the Edinburgh Corporation was held on 6 November 1894, alongside municipal elections across Scotland, and the wider British local elections. Elections took place in 5 of the cities 13 wards, with candidates in the remaining 8 being returned unopposed. A candidate, Thomas Blake, had intended to run against incumbent Lord Provost James Russell in St Cuthbert's Ward; however, due to a mistake at the nomination, Blake could not be accepted as a candidate.

Following the election the balance of power on the Corporation remained unchanged, divided between 21 Unionists and 20 Liberals. The composition, combined with a number of Liberals pledging to oppose the re-election of the Liberal Lord Provost James Russell, saw Russell replaced as Lord Provost with the Unionist candidate; Sir Andrew McDonald.

Turnout in the contested wards was 12,145 out of a total electorate of 18,741 (64.80%).

Aggregate results

Ward Results

References

1894
1894 Scottish local elections
November 1894 events